As of 2013, the United States, the Soviet Union, Japan, and the European Space Agency have conducted missions to comets.

See also
List of missions to minor planets (includes asteroids)
List of minor planets and comets visited by spacecraft

References

 

 
Missions to comets